Princess was the class lead for a set of five locomotives built by the Dublin and Kingstown Railway (D&KR) in their own Grand Canal Street works from 1841.  Princess was both the first locomotive built in Ireland and the first locomotive to be completed by a railway company in the British Isles in their own workshops.

History
By the 1840s some of the D&KRs original nine locomotives were becoming life expired, difficult to maintain with Star unusable and those from Sharp's unable to be converted to tank locomotives.  In common with other railways such as the Liverpool and Manchester Railway (L&MR) it was found the cost of buying locomotives from independent manufacturers had become extremely expensive and enough expertise had been gathered in the Company's own workshops to construct locomotives themselves.

In August 1840 locomotive superintendent Richard Pim was authorised to construct a locomotive using parts from the scrapped Star locomotive.  The design was heavily based on those previously supplied by George Forrester and Company but using trailing axle  configuration.  Princess completed and tested on 3 April 2020.  In the event few parts from Star were used, but the cost of £1050 14s 5d. compared well with the £1,000 cost of the previous locomotive from Forresters.

The second of the class, Bellisle, did use parts of Star, entered service in August 1841, with a build cost of £749 1s 0d including £378 10s 8d labour.  Three sister engines were then built in parallel, emerging from between November 1842 and July 1844 as Shamrock, Erin and Albert, the average cost of £853 being markedly less than the estimated £1400 from an external supplier.

The design was eventually found to be under powered for the D&KR's increasing needs and the 1845 Burgoyne engines were a more powerful evolvement of the design.

Dalkey atmospheric
When the Dalkey Atmospheric Railway, also operated by the D&KR, had a long breakdown in 1848 and Princess was modified to operate the section with a reduced chimney and temporary canopy to protect the engine crew from the very low loading gauge.  Princess proved capable of operating with four carriages on the heavily graded section for a couple of months.

Fleet

Notes

References

 
 
 
 
 

2-2-2WT locomotives
Railway locomotives introduced in 1841
Scrapped locomotives
Steam locomotives of Ireland
Standard gauge locomotives of Ireland
5 ft 3 in gauge locomotives